Sorgam is a 1970 Indian Tamil-language film starring Sivaji Ganesan, K. R. Vijaya, Rajasree, R. Muthuraman and K. Balaji. The film was directed by T. R. Ramanna. It was released on 29 October 1970 and became a major success, running for over 100 days at the box office.

Plot 

Three graduates, Kannan, Sampath and Shankar have different values and experience completely different things in life. Shankar wants to get rich with that being his only moral while Kannan stays honest. Sampath however is a crook and has no qualms about ruining anyone to get what he wants. Shankar still has goodness in him which attracts Vimala as they get married.

However, once Shankar starts to work and grow rich, she sees the goodness in him slowly erode. The other two also work with him but situations put them at loggerheads. In the end, Shankar relents to see that he has lost himself in his quest to become rich, changes his mind and helps the cops catch the culprits with help from Kannan and reformed Sampath.

Cast 
Sivaji Ganesan as Shankar
K. R. Vijaya as Vimala
Rajasree as Anjana
K. Balaji as Sampath
R. Muthuraman as Kannan
R. S. Manohar as Dharmalingam/Arun
M. R. R. Vasu as Mathrubootham/Bond/Ippi/Thevaram
Nagesh as Gajendran/Gajini
Sachu as Savithri/Jothi/Puppy
Kanakadurga as Lakshmi
V. Nagayya as Judge
O. A. K. Thevar as Advocate
Senthamarai as Police Inspector
Ennatha Kannaiya as Harikrishnan
M. Bhanumathi as Manju
Veeraraghavan as Headmaster
Kallapetti Singaram as Snake Charmer
Karikol Raju as Bayilvan
Karuppu Subbiah as Taxi Owner
I.S.R as Adiyapatham (office Stafe)
Gemini Mali as Gopi (office Stafe)
Samikannu as Ayyakannu (Office Stafe)
Sadan as Shankar Car Driver
S. A. Kannan as Drama Stage Actor
Periyar Rajavel as Drama stage Actor
Comedy Shanmugam as (Office clerk)
Master Ramu as Muthu (Shankar Son)

Special Appearance
Vijayalalitha as (Dancer)
Shabnam as (Dancer)

Themes 
The film features a play based on William Shakespeare's Julius Caesar where Marcus Junius Brutus murders the title character, which Ganesh Krishnamoorthy, writing for The Times of India, feels is symbolic of Balaji's character betraying Ganesan's character.

Soundtrack 
The soundtrack was composed by M. S. Viswanathan. The song "Ponmagal Vandhaal" was parodied in Pithamagan (2003), and remixed by A. R. Rahman in Azhagiya Tamil Magan (2007).

Release and reception 
Sorgam was released on 29 October 1970, Diwali day. It was the first film to be released at Devi theatre, which was inaugurated on 23 May 1970. The Indian Express said  "There are some films which try to go off the beaten track, and just when the viewer begins to say hurrah, they return to familiarity. [...] You are at a loss to discover whether the director is brave or just cunning." Despite being released alongside another Ganesan film Engirundho Vandhaal, the film was a commercial success, running for over 100 days in theatres.

References

External links 
 

1970 films
1970s Tamil-language films
Films directed by T. R. Ramanna
Films scored by M. S. Viswanathan